In the Catholic Church, the use of preconciliar rites after the Second Vatican Council has resulted in certain Latin liturgical rites coexisting with older ("preconciliar": "before the Second Vatican Council") versions of those same rites. In the postconciliar years, i.e. years following the Second Vatican Council, Pope Paul VI initiated a significant change of the Roman Rite (the predominant rite of the Latin Church), which precipitated certain other Latin rites being similarly reformed. Some of those among Paul VI's contemporaries who considered the changes to the Roman Rite Mass to be too drastic obtained from him limited permission for the continued use of the previous version of that rite's missal. In the years since, the Holy See has granted varying degrees of permission to celebrate the Roman Rite and other Latin rites in the same manner as was done prior to the council. The use of preconciliar rites is associated with the movement known as traditionalist Catholicism.

In the decades immediately after the Second Vatican Council, each of the various grants of permission to use the preconciliar Roman Rite Mass was in the form of an indult (i.e. a concession). The term universal indult was used to describe a hypothetical broadening of these concessionary permissions, but in his 2007 apostolic letter Summorum Pontificum, Pope Benedict XVI went even further than the proposed "universal indult" by elevating the status of the preconciliar forms beyond that of a concession. In 2021, however, Pope Francis reinstated restrictions on the use of the preconciliar Roman Rite Mass with his apostolic letter Traditionis custodes.

Terminology
The simultaneous use of the preconciliar rites alongside the current editions of those same rites has necessitated the development of nomenclature to distinguish the older versions from the newer ones. The preconciliar Roman Rite has been called by a wide variety of names:

 Extraordinary Form
 Usus antiquior
 Ancient Roman Rite
 Traditional Roman Rite
 Classical Roman Rite
 Tridentine Rite
 Gregorian Rite

To distinguish it from the Mass of Paul VI, the older Roman Rite Mass (that is, the 1962 revision of the Tridentine Mass) has been called at various times the:

 Indult Mass
 Tridentine Latin Mass or Traditional Latin Mass (both abbreviated as TLM), or simply the Latin Mass
 Old Order of Mass or simply the 
 Preconciliar liturgy

The preconciliar Ambrosian Rite has been called the Extraordinary Form of the Ambrosian Rite.

Because the current versions of the rites are far more widely used, they are generally identified using the name of the rite without any further specification, e.g. "Ambrosian Rite." When differentiation is required, the current version is often called the Ordinary Form of the rite. Pope Francis introduced the phrase "unique expression" to refer to the current Roman Rite in contrast to the preconciliar form.

History

Indults of Paul VI 

In June 1971, Pope Paul VI gave bishops permission to grant faculties to elderly or infirm priests to celebrate the older Roman Rite Mass without a congregation. Later that year, Cardinal John Heenan presented Paul VI with a petition signed by 57 scholars, intellectuals, and artists living in England, requesting permission to continue the use of the older Mass. On October 30, 1971, Paul VI granted this permission for England and Wales. Because Agatha Christie was one of the petition's 57 signers whose name Paul VI is said to have recognized, the indult became known as the Agatha Christie indult.

Quattuor abhinc annos (1984) 

In the 1984 letter Quattuor abhinc annos, the Congregation for Divine Worship and the Discipline of the Sacraments under Pope John Paul II extended to the entire Latin Church the indult for bishops to authorize celebrations of the preconciliar Roman Rite Mass under certain conditions.

Ecclesia Dei (1988) 

In 1988, Pope John Paul II issued  the apostolic letter Ecclesia Dei in which he urged a "wide and generous application" of the indult already given. Masses celebrated under the Ecclesia Dei framework came to be known as "Indult Masses."

John Paul II simultaneously created the Pontifical Commission Ecclesia Dei to supervise groups using the preconciliar liturgy. Days after the letter's promulgation, John Paul II instituted the Priestly Fraternity of Saint Peter to minister in the preconciliar Roman Rite exclusively.

Summorum Pontificum (2007) 

In 2007, Pope Benedict XVI issued  the apostolic letter Summorum Pontificum in which he introduced the terminology of "extraordinary form" to describe the preconciliar liturgy. Rather than using the language of concession or permission, Benedict established the preconciliar form as parallel to the postconciliar, albeit as "extraordinary" in the sense of "different." Instead of giving bishops control over the extent of  preconciliar celebrations, Benedict XVI required priests with the suitable liturgical competency to offer the preconciliar rites to "stable groups of the faithful" who requested them. Benedict also authorized the use of the older rite for the celebration of sacraments (beyond the celebration of Mass) and allowed clerics to fulfill their obligation of prayer using the Roman Breviary in lieu of the postconciliar Liturgy of the Hours. He furthermore permitted the celebration of other preconciliar Latin rites besides the Roman Rite.

The publication of Summorum Pontificum has led to an increase in the number of regularly scheduled public Tridentine Masses. On 14 June 2008 Cardinal Darío Castrillón Hoyos told a London press conference that Pope Benedict wanted every parish to offer both the old and the new forms for Sunday Mass.

On March 25, 2020 the Congregation for the Doctrine of the Faith issued two decrees giving new Eucharistic prefaces and provision for the optional celebration of more recent saints in the Tridentine form. The decree Quo magis provides seven new Eucharistic prefaces for the extraordinary form of the Mass, which may be used for particular occasions, such as votive Masses or the feast days of saints. The second decree, Cum sanctissima, establishes a provision for the celebration of the third class feasts of saints canonized after July 1960, whose memorials were established after the 1962 Roman Missal. Cum sanctissima includes a list of 70 third class feasts, equivalent to a memorial in the ordinary form.

Traditionis custodes (2021) 

In 2021, Pope Francis, motivated by a desire to stave off growing rejection of the Second Vatican Council that he perceived as developing from groups using the preconciliar rites, issued  the apostolic letter Traditionis custodes to restore the previous status quo of bishops having authority over the celebrations of Mass in the preconciliar Roman Rite. Francis stated in the letter that the current version of the Roman Rite ought to be regarded as the "unique expression of [its] lex orandi."

Liturgies

Mass 

Most groups using the preconciliar Roman Rite use the 1962 typical edition of the Tridentine Mass.

Divine Office 

In his 2007 letter Summorum Pontificum, Pope Benedict XVI permitted priests to fulfill their canonical obligation of prayer (their "divine office") using the preconciliar Roman Breviary instead of the postconciliar Liturgy of the Hours.

Sacraments 

Pope Benedict XVI in Summorum Pontificum also authorized the celebration of other sacraments according to the preconciliar rites. In 2021, the Congregation for Divine Worship and the Discipline of the Sacraments promulgated a responsa ad dubia, in light of Traditionis custodes, answering questions about the new restrictions on this practice.

Current use within the Catholic Church

Dioceses 

The number of preconciliar Roman Rite Masses celebrated by diocesan clergy grew significantly after the release of Summorum Pontificum. Many bishops, however, curtailed diocesan preconciliar Masses after the promulgation of Traditionis custodes.

Personal apostolic administration 

A unique jurisdiction is the Personal Apostolic Administration of Saint John Mary Vianney, a canonical structure erected by Pope John Paul II in 2002, geographically coterminous with the Diocese of Campos in Brazil, and dedicated to exclusively ministering in the preconciliar Roman Rite.

Institutes and societies 

Some institutes of consecrated life and societies of apostolic life in the Catholic Church use preconciliar liturgical forms exclusively, including those of the Roman Rite, Carmelite Rite, Dominican Rite, and Premonstratensian Rite.

Canonically irregular clergy 

The Society of Saint Pius X, a group of traditionalist clergy, grew out of resistance to the postconciliar liturgical changes, and continues to use the preconciliar Roman Rite exclusively. The society is "canonically irregular," meaning they operate outside of the canonical structures governed by the pope, even though they acknowledge the pope as legitimate.

Demography 

In December 2021, Catholic News Agency estimated that there were 60,000 Traditionalist Catholics in France, representing 4% to 7% of all practicing Catholics in the country, and a sizable number of these Traditionalist Catholics are with schismatic groups which are not in communion with the Holy See. These groups "show slow but steady growth each year" and tend to have younger-than-average churchgoers.

It was also estimated that 150,000 Catholics regularly attend the Tridentine Mass in the US, representing less than 1% of the 21 million  Catholics regularly attending Mass throughout the US.

Current use outside the Catholic Church 

The scope of the liturgical changes after the Second Vatican Council was one factor that led certain groups identifying as traditionalist Catholics to claim that the postconciliar popes have been incapable of holding the office of the papacy ("sedevacantism") or incapable of legitimately exercising its functions ("sedeprivationism"). Conclavist groups are those who have claimed to elect their own successor to the papacy. These groups generally use the preconciliar Roman Rite.

Promotional organizations

Societies 

Lay-led groups dedicated to the promotion of preconciliar rites and practices are often called "Latin Mass societies."

Periodicals 
 Latin Mass Magazine
 Usus Antiquior (20102012)

Notes

References

Further reading 

 

 
Traditionalist Catholicism
Second Vatican Council